Marco Quiñónez (born September 28, 1977) is a football defender. He currently plays for Barcelona Sporting Club .

External links
 

1977 births
Living people
Sportspeople from Guayaquil
Association football defenders
Ecuadorian footballers
Ecuador international footballers
C.D. Universidad Católica del Ecuador footballers
C.S. Emelec footballers
S.D. Aucas footballers
S.D. Quito footballers
C.D. Cuenca footballers